The population of Armenia includes various significant minority ethnic groups.

Demographic trends in modern history of Armenia 
According to last census, ethnic minorities in Armenia consist of less than 3% of the population. Various sources suggest different numbers, and even some of the representatives of the ethnic minorities are not informed about exact numbers. However, migration waves from Armenia always included representatives of various ethnic minorities, and as their leaders suggest, migration will continue from Armenia despite considerable improvements in the economic and political situation in Armenia.

While Armenians formed a consistent majority, Azerbaijanis were the second largest population in the republic during Soviet rule (forming about 2.5% in 1989). However, due to hostilities with neighboring Azerbaijan over the disputed region of Nagorno-Karabakh virtually all Azeris emigrated from Armenia. Conversely, Armenia received a large influx of Armenian refugees from Azerbaijan, thus giving Armenia a more homogeneous character. This forceful population exchange also affected the Christian Udi people of Azerbaijan, many of whom were perceived as Armenians due to close cultural ties between both peoples. The number of Udis residing in Armenia has increased from 19 in 1989 to about 200 by 2006.

Additionally since independence, several other ethnic groups have emigrated especially Russians (who decreased from 51,555 persons in 1989 to 14,660 in 2001), Ukrainians (8,341 in 1989 to 1,633 in 2001),Armeno-Tat, Greeks (4,650 in 1989 to 1,176 in 2001), and Belarusians (1,061 in 1989 to 160 in 2001). The numbers of Kurds , Armeno-Tats and Assyrians have remained consistent for the most part (though approximately 2,000 Assyrians have left Armenia between 1989 and 2001). Georgians have also historically been counted among the largest ethnic groups in modern Armenia, though it is likely that their numbers have dropped substantially since the 1989 Soviet census when they numbered 1,364 persons.

Demographics 
Armenia is the only republic of the former Soviet Union that boasts a nearly-homogeneous population. It is also the second-most densely populated post-Soviet state after Moldova. Ethnic minorities include Russians, Assyrians, Ukrainians, Kurds, Greeks, Georgians, and Belarusians. Smaller communities of Vlachs, Mordvins, Ossetians, Udis and Armeno-Tats also exist. Minorites of Poles and Caucasus Germans are also present, though they are heavily Russified.

Azerbaijanis 

The Azerbaijanis community in Armenia in the 20th century, represented a large number but have been virtually non-existent since 1988–1991. Most Azerbaijanis fled the country as a result of the First Nagorno-Karabakh War and the ongoing conflict between Armenia and Azerbaijan. UNHCR estimates the current population of Azerbaijanis in Armenia to be somewhere between 30 and a few hundred persons, with majority of them living in rural areas and being members of mixed couples (mostly mixed marriages), as well as elderly and sick. Most of them are also reported to have changed their names and maintain a low profile to avoid discrimination.

Yazidis 

Yazids constitute largest ethnic minority in Armenia. The Yazidis are mostly ethnic Kurds who live in the west of Armenia and are adherents of the smallest of the three branches of Yazdânism.

Kurds 

The Kurds in Armenia are an ethnic and religious minority in the country. While Yazidis, sometimes also referred as Kurds, constitute largest minority there are also a small percentage of non-Yazidi Kurds in Armenia.

Russians

Ethnic Russians are the second largest ethnic community in Armenia after the Yazidis, with their number at 14600. Even in the days of the Soviet Union, the days of the Armenian Soviet Socialist Republic, the country had the smallest percentage of Russians compared to the other 14 republics. Although some ethnic Russians left the country after independence, because of economic hardship and better opportunities, there is some flux of new ethnic Russians arriving for commercial considerations.

There are a number of Russian-language publications in the Republic, including the dailies "Golos Armenii", "Novoye Vremia" and "Respublika Armenia" and the weekly "Delovoi Expres".

The educational system also uses Russian in many domains.

Assyrians 

Assyrians are a historic presence in Armenia from very ancient times. Assyrians are the third biggest minority in Armenia after the Yazidis and Russians. Their number is estimated at 5,000. There has been a higher rate of intermarriage between the Assyrians and the Armenians.

According to the 2001 census, there are 3,409 Assyrians living in Armenia, and Armenia is home to some of the last surviving Assyrian communities outside the middle east. There were 6,000 Assyrians in Armenia before the breakup of USSR, but because of Armenia's struggling economy, the population has been cut by half, as many have emigrated to Russian areas.

Assyrians are a Christian Semitic people, Aramaic speakers who are descendants of the ancient Assyrians and Babylonians

Molokans
The Molokans are a religious sect, among Russian peasants (serfs), who broke away from the Russian Orthodox Church in the 1550s. They reject the Trinity as outlined by the Nicene Creed, the Orthodox fasts, military service, adhering to the Old Testament kosher dietary laws and do not eat pork, shellfish, or other unclean foods. They also refuse many accepted Christian practices, including water baptism. They claim to be the direct descendants of the ancient Armenian "Paulicians". They became known as the "Bogomils" of Thrace, Bulgaria, Bosnia and Serbia.

Molokan means "milk drinkers" in Russian, as they drank milk instead of fasting from it on Orthodox Fasts. There are around 5,000 Molokans in Armenia. They encourage endogamy.

Greeks 

The Greeks of Armenia are mainly descendants of Pontic Greeks, who originally lived along the shores of the Black Sea. Armenians and Greeks have co-existed for centuries.

Armeno-Tats 

Christian Tats (Armenian:hay-tater) are a distinct group of Tat-speaking Armenians that historically populated eastern parts of the South Caucasus.

Ukrainians

The origin of the Ukrainians in Armenia goes back to the mid 19th century after the migration to Transcaucasia “the Cossacks from Minor Russia” to seal the Empire’s Southern borders. The migrants worked mostly in agriculture.

Jews

Jews in Armenia are ethnic / religious Jews living in Armenia. There are about 300–500 Jews presently living in Armenia, mainly in the capital Yerevan. Although the contemporary relations between Israel and Armenia are normally good. The Jews have their religious leaders in Armenia headed by a Chief Rabbi and sociopolitical matters are run by the Jewish Council of Armenia.

Poles

Poles in Armenia are Armenian citizens who have Polish ancestry or Polish immigrants to Armenia. They make up the same population as Russians, Caucasus Germans, Italians, and Scandinavians. Some of them are born to one parent from Poland and one parent from Armenia and some of them have grandparents from Poland. They live in Amrakits, Gyumri, Vanadzor, and Yerevan. 33 of them live there. They have a school called European School in Armenia. They speak Armenian and some Polish.

Udis
The Udis (the self-name Udi, Uti) – are one of the most ancient native peoples of Caucasus as they are considered to be the descendants of the people of Caucasian Albania.

Udis reside in Azerbaijan, Georgia, Russia, Ukraine and Armenia. In Armenia, they number around 200.

The Udi language belongs to the Nakho-Dagestanian group of the Caucasian languages.
There are two primary dialects named Nij and Vartashen. Azeri, Russian, Georgian languages are also spoken.

Most Udis belong to the Orthodox Church. Centuries of life in the sphere of Perso-Islamic culture made a relevant impact on the Udi culture and mentality. This trace is noticeable in Udi folk traditions and the material culture.

Most Udis speak Udi language that is a member of the Northeast Caucasian language family. Udi is related to Lezgian and Tabasaran.

It is believed this was the main language of Caucasian Albania, which stretched from south Dagestan to current day Azerbaijan. The language is spoken by about 5,000 people including in the villages of Debedavan, Bagratashen, Ptghavan, and Haghtanak in the Tavush province of Armenia and in the village of Zinobiani (Oktomberi) in the Kvareli district of the Kakheti province in Georgia.

Versions of Udi were written in Armenian alphabet and the Georgian alphabet.

Organizations of ethnic minorities 
List of organizations of the ethnic minorities of Armenia.

See also
Demographics of Armenia

Notes

References

 
Armenia
Demographics of Armenia